The 18th Golden Melody Awards ceremony for popular music category was held on June 16, 2007. The Azio TV broadcast the show live from the Taipei Arena in Taipei, Taiwan. The ceremony recognized the best recordings, compositions, and artists of the eligibility year, which runs from January 1, 2006 to December 31, 2006.

Nominees and winners

Winners are highlighted in boldface.

Vocal category – Record label awards

Song of the Year 
 "Marry Me Today" (from Beautiful) – David Tao feat. Jolin Tsai
 "Planting Trees" (from Planting Trees) – Lin Sheng-xiang
 "Faraway" (from Still Fantasy) – Jay Chou
 "Same World" (from Without You) – Karen Mok
 "Baby (In the Night)" (from My Life Will…) – Deserts Chang
 "Little Love Song" (from Little Universe) –- Sodagreen

Best Mandarin Album 
 Wake Up – MC HotDog Blue in Love – Hao-en and Jiajia
 My Life Will… – Deserts Chang
 Little Universe – Sodagreen
 All I Want – Jyotsna Pang
 Dancing Diva – Jolin Tsai

 Best Taiwanese Album 
 Jin Ei Ah Gey Ei!? – The Chairman The Whales – Chen Ming-chang
 Poah Poe – Jody Chiang
 Depose – Bang Bang Band
 Thanx 4 Looking – New Formosa Band

 Best Hakka Album 
 Planting Trees – Lin Sheng-xiang The Snow Wolfman – You Zhao-qi
 Mountain and Farmland – Hsieh Yu-wei

 Best Aboriginal Album 
 Beautiful Haiyan – Xiao-mei, Chen Yong-long, Ara Kimbo, Wu Hao-en, Suming, A-luo, Ka-silaw Singing a Beautiful Song – Taiwu Ancient Ballads Troupe

 Vocal category – Individual awards 

 Best Music Video Director 
 Stephen Fung – "Same World" (from Without You) Jay Chou – "Popular Imitation" (from Still Fantasy)
 Fish Wang – "The Man Who Makes Words" (from The Light of Darkness)
 Chen Pei-fu – "Happiness" (from Happiness)
 Tsao Jui-yuan – "Pure Love" (from My Endless Love)
 Chou Ko-tai – "Commitment" - (from Commitment)

 Best Composition 
 Wu Tsing-fong – "Little Love Song" (from Little Universe) Lin Sheng-xiang – "Planting Trees" (from Plating Trees)
 Deserts Chang – "Baby (In the Night) (from My Life Will...)
 Li Tai-hsiang – "Mountain and Farmland" (from Mountain and Farmland)
 David Tao – "Marry Me Today" (from Beautiful)
 Kenji Wu – "A General Order" (from A General Order)

 Best Lyrics 
 Zhong Yong-feng – "Planting Trees" (from Planting Trees) Vincent Fang – "Chrysanthemum Terrace" (from Still Fantasy)
 Wu Yu-hsuan – "Grandpa's Bed" (from Poah Poe)
 Lin Xi – "Same World" (from Without You)
 Deserts Chang – "Baby (In the Night)" (from My Life Will...)
 Wu Tsing-fong – "Little Love Song" (from Little Universe)

 Best Music Arrangement 
 Chen Zhu-hui – "The Man Who Makes Words" (from The Light of Darkness) Yao Hung – "Fearless" (from Fearless)
 Wayne Wang – "Lost" (from Blue in Love)
 Li Yu-huan – "Savage Night (Club Mix 2000)" (from New Wave)
 Sodagreen – "Little Love Song" (from Little Universe)

 Producer of the Year, Album 
 Chen Hui-ting, Hsu Che-liu, Lin Chien-yuan, Bean Lin, Peggy Hsu – It's All My Fault
 Lin Sheng-xiang, Zhong Yong-feng, Zhong Shi-fang – Plating Trees
 Hao-en – Blue in Love
 Lin Wei-che – Little Universe
 Bang Bang Band – Tong Zhi

Producer of the Year, Single 
 Jay Chou – "Fearless" (from Fearless)
 Chu Chien-hui, Hai Er – "The Descendants of Yandi and Huangdi Emperors" (from The Descendants of Yandi and Huangdi Emperors)
 Adia – "Dancing Diva" (from Dancing Diva)

Best Mandarin Male Singer 
 Nicky Lee
 JJ Lin
 Gary Chaw
 David Tao
 Kenji Wu

Best Taiwanese Male Singer 
 Michael Shih'Michael Shih
 Yuan Xiao-di
 Cheng Gin-yi
 Chen Ming-chang
 Chen Lei

Best Mandarin Female Singer 
 Jolin Tsai
 Angela Chang
 Jyotsna Pang
 A-mei
 Penny Tai
 Sandy Lam

Best Taiwanese Female Singer 
 Jeannie Hsieh
 Laney Wu
 Showlen Maya
 Fang Yi-ping

Best Hakka Singer 
 Lin Sheng-xiang
 Hsieh Yu-wei
 Song Chen
 Tang Ming-liang

Best Aboriginal Singer 
 I Jyi
 Yu Chia-chen
 Lin Chao-ming

Best Band 
 Sodagreen
 Hai Er
 13
 Self Kill
 Tizzy Bac
 Totem
 Monkey Insane

Best Group 
 Wu-en and Jiajia
 Nan Quan Mama
 Michelle Vickie
 New Formosa Band

Best New Artist 
 Europa Huang
 Zhang Xianzi
 A-lin
 Evan Yo

Instrumental category – Record label awards

Best Instrumental Album 
 Send You a Blue Gift for Winter – Tao Wang, Sino Chen Night Flower – Lin Shao-ying
 I-Yen-Mei-Leg Village No.3 – Purdur
 Ocarina Dreamer – You Xue-zhi

 Instrumental category – Individual awards 

 Producer of the Year, Instrumental 
 Purdur – I-Yen-Mei-Leg Village No.3
 Eric Chung, Lo Bei-tuo – Sun, Latino
 Tao Wang, Sino Chen – Send You a Blue Gift for Winter
 Gerald Shih, Cosine Tseng – Cynthia's Magical Fingers

Lifetime Contribution Award 
 Chang Hung-yi

Special awards

Most Popular Male Artist/Group (Popular vote) 
 Show Lo

Most Popular Female Artist/Group (Popular vote) 
 Jolin Tsai

References

Golden Melody Awards
Golden Melody Awards
Golden Melody Awards
Golden Melody Awards